Peyton Graham (born January 26, 2001) is an American baseball shortstop in the Detroit Tigers organization. He played college baseball for the Oklahoma Sooners.

Amateur career
Graham grew up in Waxahachie, Texas and attended Waxahachie High School. He was named the 10-5A Offensive Player of the Year during his junior season. As a senior, Graham hit for a .374 average with five home runs, 19 RBIs, and 17 runs scored and also pitched to a 2.80 ERA and 22 strikeouts. He also played in the Texas High School Baseball Coaches All-Star Game.

As a freshman, Graham started all 18 of Oklahoma's games before it was cut short due to the coronavirus pandemic and batted .358 with three home runs, eight doubles, and 10 RBIs. He was named second team All-Big 12 Conference after hitting .288 with 11 home runs and 28 RBIs in his sophomore season. After the season, Graham played collegiate summer baseball for the Yarmouth–Dennis Red Sox of the Cape Cod Baseball League. Graham was named a preseason All-American by Baseball America entering his junior season. He was also moved from third base to shortstop.

Professional career
Graham was drafted in the second round, 51st overall, by the Detroit Tigers in the 2022 Major League Baseball draft. He signed with the team on July 25, 2022, and received an over-slot signing bonus of $1.8 million.

References

External links

Oklahoma Sooners bio

2001 births
Living people
Baseball players from Texas
Baseball shortstops
Oklahoma Sooners baseball players
Waxahachie High School alumni
Yarmouth–Dennis Red Sox players